Apostolic Vicariate of Batavia may refer to the following missionary Roman Catholic jurisdictions:

 Apostolic Vicariate of Batavia (Holland)
 Apostolic Vicariate of Batavia (Java)